"Got to Be Real" is the third episode of the eleventh season (223rd episode overall) of the American television medical drama Grey's Anatomy. It aired on October 9, 2014 on ABC in the United States. The episode was written by Zoanne Clack and directed by Rob Corn. On its initial airing it was watched by 8.48 million viewers and was well received amongst critics.

In the episode Owen introduces Callie to the Veterans Hospital patients in hopes that she will help them with her robotic limb lab, Jo becomes jealous of Alex and Meredith’s friendship, and Maggie continues to confide in Richard. Meanwhile, Alex and Bailey prepare to go in front of the board.

Plot
Callie follows Owen through a Veterans' rehab facility. She says that she's there to give a speech on residual limb health and that is it, because she has a child and she and Arizona are trying to have another one and Arizona's starting a fellowship and she's stretched too far already. Owen says she's just going to meet a couple guys. They enter a room where several amputee veterans are gathered. until Jackson steps in. As Alex tries to prepare for his presentation to fill Cristina's position on the board, Meredith distracts him with the news of her new half-sister Maggie in the shower, and Jo becomes jealous.

Searching through hospital records, Meredith finds out that Maggie is indeed her half-sister. Ellis was unknowingly pregnant when she was admitted for slitting her wrists. Derek and Amelia fight over being the Chief of Neurosurgery, which makes Derek second guess his decision to stay in Seattle. With the new fellowship and the wounded veterans project, Arizona is concerned about having the time to have another baby causing Callie to once again doubt their future together.

Richard attempts to tell Maggie that he is her father, but she already knew who he is and blames him for not telling her sooner. Alex and Bailey go head to head in front of the board for the open spot. Bailey comes in and gives her presentation, then Alex gives his. Arizona peeks out of the room and calls Alex in. He follows her back into the room. A few moments later, he comes back out and tells Bailey congratulations as he walks past her. Arizona then calls Bailey back into the room. The board congratulates her as Alex continues to walk out of the hospital.

Reception

Broadcast
"Got to Be Real" was originally broadcast on October 9, 2014, in the United States on the American Broadcasting Company (ABC). The episodes were watched by a total of 8.48 million viewers. In the key 18-49 demographic, the episode scored a 2.4/8 score and ranked 18 in viewership for 18-49 demographics.

Reviews
Entertainment Weekly gave a mixed review praising Justin Chambers' character Alex Karev stating, "What could have been the darkest and most dramatic face-off of the episode ended up being the most enjoyable, mostly because watching Karev adapt to being Meredith’s person—which means letting go of any sort of personal boundaries he might have—is fun, funny, and feels so very right." and further adding on Ellen Pompeo's character wrote, "She’s not grateful that he’s home because her career is just as important as his. “I’m the sun, and he can go suck it!” Ah, yes. A drunk Meredith is the best Meredith."

Fempop also lauded Pompeo for her portrayal of Meredith Grey saying, I can’t decide what my favorite scene of Got To Be Real is which probably means it was an excellent episode. Like do I choose Meredith drunkenly calling herself the sun and thus revealing years of pent up insecurity. Or her uncapping the lid on her self-absorption jar to complain to Alex while he showers? Or maybe the part where she’s about to tell Derek about her sister but he’s being such a monumental McAss that she clams up like they’re stuck in season 2. See what I’m saying? I’m excited about a Meredith plot you guys. That means things are good." also praised Callie Torres adding, "The Callie/Owen screaming match gave me life. Finally someone besides Cristina is putting him in his place. The hug and his confession and her taking no shit later also helped."

TV Fanatic also gave largely positive review to the episode, "There are so many shows that I keep watching out of loyalty. Grey's Anatomy is the exception. Even in its 11th season, I'm seriously still loving that Shonda and company are totally bringing their A-game." also enjoying Meredith-Alex story, "I love seeing Alex and Meredith together, but I'm missing Jolex moments like crazy."

References

Grey's Anatomy (season 11) episodes
2014 American television episodes